The Emancipation Statue is a public sculpture symbolising the "breaking of the chains" of slavery at Emancipation. It is located in Barbados, east of Bridgetown at centre of the J.T.C. Ramsay roundabout formed at the junction of the ABC Highway and Highway 5.  Many Barbadians refer to the statue as Bussa, the name of a slave who helped inspire a revolt against the plantocracy society in Barbados in 1816, though the statue is not actually sculpted to be Bussa.

The statue, made of bronze, was created in 1985 by Barbadian-Guyanese sculptor Karl Broodhagen 20 years after the island's independence.

In 1998 the Cuban President, Fidel Castro delivered an impassioned speech at the statue during his visit to Barbados.

Inscription

This was the chant of thousands of Barbadians when slavery was abolished in 1838, signifying their freedom, joy and happiness. Five years after the passage of the Slavery Abolition Act of 1833.

See also 
 List of slaves
 Coffy (person)
 Emancipation Park (Kingston, Jamaica)

References

External links
Official government website
Link to image
Bussa, Organization of American States - Children's Page
Bussa's Rebellion - British National Archives

1985 sculptures
Black people in art
Bronze sculptures in Barbados
Buildings and structures in Barbados
Monuments and memorials in Barbados
Outdoor sculptures
Slavery in art
Slavery memorials